Jarvis Williams (born October 15, 1987) is an American football wide receiver who is currently a free agent. He played college football at the North Carolina State University.

College career
Williams continued his football career in college, playing for the NC State Wolfpack football team. During his college career, he had 133 receptions for 1,764 yards and 20 touchdowns; all of which rank in the top 11 of their respective categories for Wolfpack receivers.

Professional career

Orlando Predators
In 2012, Williams was assigned to the Orlando Predators of the Arena Football League (AFL).

Jacksonville Sharks
In March 2013, Williams signed with the Jacksonville Sharks. In late May, Williams was placed on recallable reassignment.

Return to Orlando
Williams returned to the Predators to finish the 2013 season.

San Jose SaberCats
On January 16, 2014, Williams was traded to the San Jose SaberCats for Justin Edison. Williams was plagued with injuries, twice being listed on injured reserve by the SaberCats.

Tampa Bay Storm
Williams was assigned to the Tampa Bay Storm in 2015. He was placed on reassignment on May 11, 2015.

References

External links
NC State Wolfpack bio
Arena Football bio

Living people
1987 births
American football wide receivers
NC State Wolfpack football players
Orlando Predators players
Jacksonville Sharks players
San Jose SaberCats players
Tampa Bay Storm players
Jones High School (Orlando, Florida) alumni